Play65 is an online backgammon operator established in 2004 by an Israeli-based company, SkillEmpire, that hosts real-time backgammon games and tournaments.  With its client software available in 21 languages, including English, Arabic, Chinese, Danish, Dutch, etc.  Play65 has more than 5,000,000 registered players, making it one of the biggest backgammon communities online. Play65 is licensed by the Alderney Gambling Control Commission (AGCC).

This site ceased operation in September 2012.

Background 
Play65 allows two types of backgammon play: play money, where players are using virtual credit that is of no real value; and real money, where actual deposits are required and real money is at stake with each game or match. There are many ways to deposit for real money play, including by credit card, PayPal, and Moneybookers.

As with other similar online gaming services, Play65 uses a pseudorandom number generator for producing dice rolls. The company provides documentation to indicate that the algorithm produces adequately random results.

Software 
Play65's backgammon client is freeware. Users can play real-time online backgammon games against thousands of players from around the world. Since November 2006, Mac, Linux, and PDA users can use Play65's Java version of its backgammon client.

Controversy 
In December 2006, Play65 received a court order from the Israeli Attorney General calling to close all its real money activity to Israeli users, claiming it is seen as a sort of illegal gambling. In May 2007, the Attorney General withdrew its demand and allowed SkillEmpire to open Play65 for Israeli users. The Attorney General decision said: "According to the law, a backgammon web site is still seen as a gambling site, which is illegal. However, there are special concerns specific to Play65: The company is not taking part in the gambling activity; third parties cannot bet on game outcomes; winning amounts are limited; and the company tries to avoid participation of minors in the games. Thus, we can say that Play65 is not a standard gambling web site, and as such we allow its activities."

VIP Club

In August 2010, Play65 has launched a VIP Club, the first one in the online backgammon market. Similar to the comps system commonly used in casinos (online and land-based), the players accumulate points while playing backgammon games for money and are required to reach a certain number of points to reach one of the three VIP statuses (Bronze, Silver, and Gold). The points can be exchanged for cash or goods from the exclusive gift shop, or for tournaments buy-ins.

See also
First Internet Backgammon Server

Notes

External links
 

Backgammon
Online gambling companies of Israel
Multiplayer online games
Video games developed in Israel
Video games based on board games
Software companies of Israel